Mietje "Marie" Baron (5 February 1908 – 23 July 1948) was a Dutch swimmer and diver who competed at the 1924 and 1928 Olympics. In 1924 she was sixth in the 4 × 100 m freestyle relay. She was disqualified in the first round of the 200 m breaststroke event, as the judges believed she touched the wall with one hand instead of two hands at one of the turns. Meanwhile, her time of 3:22.6 was several seconds ahead of the gold medalist. Four years later she swam 3:15.2, but this was only enough for a silver medal, as her main rival Hilde Schrader clocked 3:12.6. At the 1928 Games Baron also competed in the 10 m platform diving event and finished fourth.

Between 1926 and 1928 Baron set four breaststroke world records, two in the 200 m (3:18:40 on 24 October 1926 and 3:12:80 on 22 April 1928) and two in the obsolete 400 m event (6:54:80 on 20 March 1927 and 6:45:60 on 25 November 1928). In October 1929 she announced her engagement and retired from swimming. Next year she married Pieter Lourens de Puij.

References

1908 births
1948 deaths
Dutch female divers
Dutch female freestyle swimmers
Dutch female breaststroke swimmers
Olympic swimmers of the Netherlands
Olympic divers of the Netherlands
Swimmers at the 1924 Summer Olympics
Swimmers at the 1928 Summer Olympics
Divers at the 1928 Summer Olympics
Olympic silver medalists for the Netherlands
Swimmers from Rotterdam
Medalists at the 1928 Summer Olympics
Olympic silver medalists in swimming
20th-century Dutch women
20th-century Dutch people